Ramadan Aly (born 10 January 1965) is an Egyptian weightlifter. He competed in the men's flyweight event at the 1988 Summer Olympics.

References

External links

1965 births
Living people
Egyptian male weightlifters
Olympic weightlifters of Egypt
Weightlifters at the 1988 Summer Olympics
Place of birth missing (living people)
20th-century Egyptian people